5th Gorkha Rifles (Frontier Force), also abbreviated as 5 GR(FF) is an infantry regiment of the Indian Army comprising Gurkha soldiers of Nepalese origin. It was formed in 1858 as part of the British Indian Army.
The regiment's battalions served in the First World War (Mesopotamia) and Second World War (Anglo-Soviet invasion of Iran, Mediterranean, Italian campaign, and in Burma). 

The regiment was known as the 5th Royal Gurkha Rifles (Frontier Force) when it was one of the Gurkha regiments that was transferred to the Indian Army following independence of Indian and Pakistan in 1947 and given its current name in 1950. 

Since 1947, the regiment has served in a number of conflicts, including the Indo-Pakistani War of 1965 and the Indo-Pakistani War of 1971. It has also participated in peacekeeping operations in Sri Lanka.

History

19th century
The regiment was raised in 1858 as the 25th Native Punjab Infantry, also known as the "Hazara Goorkha Battalion". The soldiers of the regiment originated from the Kingdom of Nepal and in 1861 it was renamed the 5th Gurkha Regiment. The regiment's first major action was during the Second Afghan War, where they were awarded their first battle honour at Peiwar Kotal and Captain John Cook was awarded the Victoria Cross. In 1891 the regiment was awarded the prestigious title of a Rifle regiment and became 5th Gurkha (Rifle) Regiment which was shortened to 5th Gurkha Rifles in 1901.

The regiment spent most of its time up to the end of the 19th century based in the Punjab as part of the Punjab Frontier Force (PIF or PIFFER), and its regimental centre was at the frontier hill town of Abbottabad, in the Hazara region of North-West Frontier Province (now Khyber Pakhtunkhwa in Pakistan). This connection was reflected when in 1903, the regiment was renamed the 5th Gurkha Rifles (Frontier Force).

First World War

During the First World War, the regiment primarily saw service in the Middle East—the 1st Battalion saw extensive and hard service at Gallipoli in 1915 (where seven officers and 129 men were killed in the first few hours after the battalion landed). During the withdrawal, a company of the 5th Gurkhas were among the last troops to leave.

The 2nd Battalion initially served in India with the 2nd (Rawalpindi) Division before transferring to Mesopotamia in April 1916 and joining the 42nd Indian Brigade, 15th Indian Division. The 1st Battalion joined them in March 1917 from the 1st (Peshawar) Division and both battalions fought together at the action of Khan Baghdadi. A 3rd Battalion was raised for service on the North-West Frontier, before being disbanded in 1921.

Inter-War period
In 1921, the regiment was given the title the 5th Royal Gurkha Rifles, in recognition of its service during the First World War. During the inter-war period, the regiment received three further battle honours, for the Third Afghan War in 1919, and two for service on the North West Frontier. The regiment together with the 13th Duke of Connaught's Own Lancers were the only units awarded such honours.

Second World War

During the Second World War, the 1st Battalion 5th Gurkhas as part of the 8th Indian Infantry Division's 17th Indian Infantry Brigade served in the Mediterranean and Middle East Theatre (including the Italian Campaign). Rifleman Thaman Gurung of the 1st Battalion won the Victoria Cross while serving in Italy.

The 2nd Battalion served in the Far East in the Burma Campaign as part of the 17th Indian Infantry Division and was involved in the retreat of the British Indian Army from Burma, they were one of four battalions chosen to fight as the rearguard at the Sittang River, which formed the border with India. When the bridge over the river was blown up, preventing the Japanese forces from entering India, many of the regiment were left on the wrong side. The regiment was involved in the re-entry into Burma in 1943 where three members of the regiment were awarded the Victoria Cross. After the war, the 2nd Battalion was re-issued with new uniforms, equipment and transport and posted to Tokyo in Japan as part of the British Commonwealth Occupation Force.

The 4th Battalion was raised in 1941 and also served in the Burma Campaign as part of the 7th Indian Infantry Division, fighting in five epic battles at North Arakan, Buthidaung (Battle of the Admin Box), Kohima, Pakkoku (Irrawaddy), and Sittang. The battalion had the unique distinction of getting four Battle Honours for the five battles fought. Major I M Brown of the 4th Battalion was one of the few soldiers of the Second World War who was awarded the Military Cross three times.

Post Independence

On Independence, the 5th Royal Gurkha Rifles (Frontier Force) was one of the six Gurkha regiments that remained part of the new Indian Army; they were renamed the 5th Gorkha Rifles (Frontier Force) in 1950. The Regiment now has a total of six Battalions and has participated in virtually every major action the Indian Army has undertaken in its four wars with Pakistan, including the first heliborne operations undertaken by the army during the 1971 war. The regiment has participated in the following actions:

 Indo-Pak War of 1947–48
 Indo-Pakistani War of 1965
 Battle of Topa (Jammu and Kashmir)
 Battle of Atgram (East Pakistan) 1971
 Battle of Sylhet (East Pakistan) 1971
 Battle of Gazipur (East Pakistan—Bangladesh) 1971

The 1st and 4th Battalions were also a part of the Indian Peace Keeping Force which served in Sri Lanka and fought against the LTTE. During this deployment, the 4th Battalion's commander, Lieutenant Colonel Bawa, was injured and later died, along with many of his officers and soldiers. The regiment's present headquarters are at Shillong, in North-Eastern India.

Lineage
1858–1861: 25th Punjab Infantry
1861–1891: 5th Gurkha Regiment
1891–1901: 5th Gurkha (Rifle) Regiment
1901–1903: 5th Gurkha Rifles
1903–1921: 5th Gurkha Rifles (Frontier Force)
1921–1950: 5th Royal Gurkha Rifles
1950–present: 5th Gorkha Rifles (Frontier Force).

Regimental Battalions and Affiliations
 
 1st Battalion: 'FASFIF' & 'Jethi' is affiliated to 56 Field Regiment (JITRA) of The Indian Army.
 2nd Battalion: 'SEKINFIF' (Victoria Cross Paltan)
 3rd Battalion: 'THREEFIF'
 4th Battalion: 'FOFIFF' & 'KANCHI',is affiliated to 110 Helicopter Unit, Indian Air Force.
 5th Battalion: 'FIVFIV' &' CHINDITS' ( Ashok Chakra Paltan)
 6th Battalion: 
 33 Rashtriya Rifles (58 GR)
INS Khukri (P49): A 'Khukri'-class corvette of the Indian Navy

Battle honours
 19th century: Peiwar Kotal, Charasiah, Kabul 1879, Kandahar 1880, Afghanistan 1878–80, Punjab Frontier;
 First World War: Suez Canal, Egypt 1915–16, Khan Baghdadi, Mesopotamia 1916–18, Helles, Krithia, Suvla, Sari Bair, Gallipoli 1915, North West Frontier 1917;
 Inter War Years: Afghanistan 1919, North West Frontier 1930, North West Frontier 1936–39;
 Second World War: The Sangro, Caldari, Cassino II, San Angelo in Teodice, Rocca d'Arce, Ripa Ridge, Femmina Morta, Monte San Bartolo, The Senio, Italy 1943–45, Sittang 1942, Yenangyaung 1942, Buthidaung, Stockades, North Arakan, Chindits 1944, Mogaung, Imphal, Sakawng, Shenam Pass, Bishenpur, The Irrawaddy 1942–45, Sittang 1945, Burma 1942–45;
 Post Independence: Zoji La, Kargil, Jammu and Kashmir 1947–48, Charwa, Punjab 1965, Sylhet, East Pakistan 1971, Jammu and Kashmir 1971, Sehjra, Punjab 1971.

Victoria Cross recipients
There were seven Victoria Crosses awarded to British officers and Gurkhas serving with the regiment prior to 1947:

 Captain John Cook (1st Battalion): Afghanistan, 2 December 1878 (posthumously)
 Lieutenant Guy Boisragon (1st Battalion): Hunza,  2 December 1891
 Lieutenant John Manners-Smith (1st Battalion): Hunza, 20 December 1891
 Havildar Gaje Ghale (2nd Battalion): Burma, 27 May 1943 
 Naik Agansing Rai (2nd Battalion): Burma, 26 June 1944
 Jemadar Netrabahadur Thapa (2nd Battalion): Burma, 26 June 1944 (posthumously)
 Rifleman Thaman Gurung (1st Battalion): Italy, 10 November 1944 (posthumously)

Maha Vir Chakra recipients 
The following members of the regiment have received the Maha Vir Chakra:
 Lieutenant Colonel Anant Singh Pathania, MC (1st Battalion)
 L/Havildar Ram Prasad Gurung (1st Battalion)
 Major General H K Sibal
 Brigadier (Later Lt. Gen.) Zoravar Chand Bakshi
 Brigadier Mohindar Lal Whig
 Lieutenant Colonel (Later Brigadier) Arun Bhimrao Harolikar (4th Battalion)
 Rifleman (Later Havildar) Dil Bahadur Chettri (4th Battalion)
 Lieutenant Colonel Inder Bal Singh Bawa {Posthumous} (4th Battalion)

See also
 Abbottabad
 Gorkha regiments (India)
 Royal Gurkha Rifles
 St. Luke's Church, Abbottabad

Notes

References
 Anon. (1956). History of the 5th Royal Gurkha Rifles (Frontier Force), 1858–1947 (2 vols.), Aldershot, UK: Gale & Polden.
 Gaylor, John (1992). Sons of John Company: A History of the Indian and Pakistan Armies. London, UK: Spellmount Press.
 Palsokar, Col. R. D. (1990). History of the 5th Gorkha Rifles. Shillong: 9 Regt Centre.
 Parker, John (2005). The Gurkhas: The Inside Story of the World's Most Feared Soldiers. Headline Book Publishing. .
 Roberts, M.R. (1952). Golden Arrow, Aldershot, Gale & Polden.

External links
 

1858 establishments in India
British Indian Army infantry regiments
Gurkhas
Infantry regiments of the Indian Army from 1947
Military units and formations established in 1858
Rifle regiments
R
Units of the Indian Peace Keeping Force